Leo Docherty (born 4 October 1976) is a British politician serving as Parliamentary Under-Secretary of State for Europe since September 2022. He served as  Minister of State for Europe from September to October 2022. He served as Minister for Defence People from July 2022 to September 2022. A member of the Conservative Party, he has been the Member of Parliament (MP) for Aldershot since 2017. Prior to being elected as an MP he served in the Scots Guards, before working in publishing and for the Conservative Party. He is the author of Desert of Death (2007).

Early life and career
Leo Docherty was born in Glasgow and grew up in Gloucestershire. He studied Swahili and Hindi at SOAS, University of London between 1996 and 2000, before attending the Royal Military Academy Sandhurst the following year. From 2001 to 2007 he served in the Scots Guards. After being posted to London on ceremonial duties and a period spent in Germany, he served operationally in Iraq and Afghanistan as a British Army officer.

After leaving the army, he wrote about his first-hand account of the war in Afghanistan in his book Desert of Death, which was published by Faber in 2007. Living in Didcot in Oxfordshire, he created and worked as editor and publisher of Steppe magazine - a now defunct publication that covered the arts, culture, history, landscape and people of Central Asia. He was appointed Director of the Conservative Middle East Council in 2010, a role in which he served until being elected as an MP.

Docherty stood successfully as the Conservative candidate in the Hagbourne ward of South Oxfordshire District Council in May 2011, standing down at the end of his four-year term when the wards were revised. He stood unsuccessfully as the Conservative candidate in the Wallingford division of Oxfordshire County Council in May 2017.

Parliamentary career

Docherty unsuccessfully applied to be the Conservative Party candidate for the Labour Party held Oxford East constituency in 2014. He was instead chosen to contest the safe Labour Party held seat of Caerphilly in the 2015 general election, where he came third.

In 2017, he was selected as the Conservative Party candidate for Aldershot, after the incumbent Conservative MP Gerald Howarth announced he was standing down at the next general election. The Financial Times called his selection "the highest-profile tussle over a candidate choice, [in which] the party leadership rejected a request from activists in Aldershot to be allowed to consider Daniel Hannan, the prominent Eurosceptic MEP, for the safe Tory seat". He was duly elected at the 2017 general election.

In the House of Commons he sits on the Defence Committee and Committees on Arms Export Controls (formerly Quadripartite Committee).

He backed Boris Johnson in the 2019 Conservative Party leadership election. On 29 July 2019, Johnson appointed Docherty as an Assistant Government Whip.

In September 2019, Leo's brother Paddy Docherty wrote an open letter to The Guardian urging him to resign, writing: "Now I am simply appalled that this government, of which you are sadly a part, has become the principal threat to the lives and liberties of the people. Please do the decent thing, and resign."

On 21 April 2021 Docherty succeeded Johnny Mercer as Parliamentary Under-Secretary of State for Defence People and Veterans. He became Minister for Defence People on 7 July 2022.

Gulf States
In the six months after being elected as an MP, Docherty registered four trips to Saudi Arabia and Bahrain, costing over £15,000 and paid for by the Governments of the host countries. Prior to this, his election campaign had benefited from donations totalling over £10,000 from donors with links to the Gulf States. As Chair of the Conservative Middle East Council and since serving as an MP, Docherty has frequently praised the work of the governments in Saudi Arabia and Bahrain and has been subject to some criticism from opposition MPs and journalists, such as Peter Oborne for his links and his failure to always declare his register of interests when speaking on the subject in Parliament. However, Docherty has denied any conflict of interest and, as Director of the Conservative Middle East Council, responded to criticism of donations received there as not having influenced decision-making within the group. Docherty's trips were worth £26,893 in total and were the highest valued of any MP's trips during the year following the 2017 general election.

In September 2022, Leo Docherty was appointed as a minister of state at the Foreign, Commonwealth and Development Office. Human rights groups were concerned that he could be made minister for the Middle East. Leo has accepted over £30,000 in hospitality from repressive Gulf states such as Saudi Arabia, Bahrain, Kuwait and the UAE since 2017.

Personal life 
He is married to Lucy Docherty and they have two children.

Campaign medals

Notes

Publications
Desert of Death.  A Soldier's Journey from Iraq to Afghanistan, Faber and Faber, London 2007, ISBN 
978-0-571-23688-6

References

External links

Living people
UK MPs 2017–2019
UK MPs 2019–present
Alumni of SOAS University of London
Graduates of the Royal Military Academy Sandhurst
1976 births
Scots Guards officers
British Army personnel of the Iraq War
British Army personnel of the War in Afghanistan (2001–2021)
Conservative Party (UK) MPs for English constituencies